Finishing School is a 1953 French-Italian comedy film directed by Bernard Vorhaus and starring Susan Stephen, Anna Maria Ferrero and Jacques Sernas. It was made at Cinecittà with sets designed by the art director Franco Lolli. It is also known by the alternative title of Luxury Girls.

Plot 
After finishing her studies, an American, Susan Miller, spends a vacation period in Rome with her parents. His father, a wealthy man who led a dissipated life, sent him to complete his worldly education at the famous college of Mont-Fleuri, Switzerland.

Cast
 Susan Stephen as Lorna Whitmore  
 Anna Maria Ferrero as Valerie De Beranger  
 Jacques Sernas as Jean-Jacques  
 Steve Barclay as George Whitmore  
 Marina Vlady as Eljay  
 Brunella Bovo as Jeannie Gordon  
 Rossana Podestà as Pereira 
 Elisa Cegani as Madame Charpentier  
 Claudio Gora as Professor Charpentier  
 Estelle Brody as Mrs. Whitmore  
 Lawrence Ward as Greg Wilson  
 Paola Mori as Beejay  
 Roberto Risso as Steve  
 Eva Vanicek as Statistician  
 Vera Palumbo as Knitter  
 Anna Casini as Albino  
 Colette Laurent as Boopie  
 Bianca Manenti as Maid  
 Charles Rutherford as Jean-Jacques' friend  
 Mary Alcaide as Ballet Mistress 
 Liana Del Balzo as Princess De Vick-Beranger  
 Franco Lodi as Riding Instructor  
 Leopoldo Savona as Boyfriend of Val 
 Luisella Boni 
 Giovanna Pala 
 Roberta Primavera

References

Bibliography 
 Heiko Feldner, Claire Gorrara & Kevin Passmore. The Lost Decade? The 1950s in European History, Politics, Society and Culture. Cambridge Scholars Publishing, 2010.

External links 
 

1953 comedy films
French comedy films
Italian comedy films
1953 films
1950s Italian-language films
Films directed by Bernard Vorhaus
Films shot at Cinecittà Studios
Italian black-and-white films
French black-and-white films
1950s French films
1950s Italian films